The Beriev MBR-2 was a Soviet multi-purpose (including reconnaissance) flying boat which entered service with the Soviet Navy in 1935. Out of 1,365 built, 9 were used by foreign countries including Finland and North Korea. In Soviet Union it sometimes carried the nickname of "Kорова" (cow) and "Амбар" (barn).

Design
The MBR-2 was designed by Georgy Mikhailovich Beriev and first flew in 1931, powered by an imported 373 kW (500 hp) BMW VI.Z engine. Production models, which arrived in 1934, used a licence-built version of this engine, the Mikulin M-17 of 508 kW (680 hp), and could be fitted with a fixed wheel or ski undercarriage.

Beriev also designed a commercial airliner derivation, the MP-1, which entered airline service in 1934, and a freighter version, which followed in 1936.

In 1935, an improved version was developed, the MBR-2bis, powered by the Mikulin AM-34N engine, and fitted with an enclosed cockpit, dorsal gun-turret and enlarged vertical tail. In this configuration, the machine remained in production until 1941. As with the MBR-2, the bis spawned a commercial derivative and the MP-1bis entered service in 1937.

Variants
 MBR-2M-17 : Short-range maritime reconnaissance, bombing flying-boat, powered by a 508 kW (680 hp) Mikulin M-17B piston engine.
 MBR-2AM-34 or MBR-2bis : Improved version, powered by a Mikulin AM-34N engine.
 MBR-2M-103 : One MBR-2AM-34 was fitted with the more powerful M-103 engine. One prototype only.
 MP-1 : Civil version of the MBR-2M-17 flying-boat. It could carry six passengers in an enclosed cabin. 
 MP-1bis : Civil version of the MBR-2AM-34 flying-boat.
 MP-1T : Freight transport conversion of MBR-2.

Operators

The Finnish Air Force operated five captured aircraft from 1941.
 
Aeroflot
Soviet Naval Aviation

North Korean Air Force

Specifications (MBR-2bis)

See also

References

Bibliography

External links

 Beriev MBR-2 at aeroflight.co.uk
 Century of Flight
 Beriev MBR-2, TsKB-25 (project and prototype)  at Russian Aviation Museum
 MBR-2 series with M-17 engine  at Russian Aviation Museum
 Beriev MP-1, MP-1bis, MP-1T  (civilian variant) at Russian Aviation Museum

MBR-2
High-wing aircraft
Single-engined pusher aircraft
Flying boats
1930s Soviet military reconnaissance aircraft
Aircraft first flown in 1931
World War II aircraft of Finland